Helcystogramma compositaepictum is a moth in the family Gelechiidae. It was described by Natalia Viktorovna Omelko and Mikhail Mikhailovich Omelko in 1993. It is known from Russia, where it has been recorded from south-eastern Siberia.

References

Moths described in 1993
compositaepictum
Moths of Asia